Sir Alexander Stewart of Darnley (died 1404) was a Scottish nobleman.

Life
He was the son of Sir Alexander Stewart of Darnley (d. after 26 August 1374) and Joanna. He married first Janet Turnbull of Minto and had at least one son with her. He married second Jonetta Keith, widow of David Hamilton of Cadzow, and daughter of Sir William Keith of Galston, and was granted his wife's lands of Galston by John Stewart, Earl of Carrick and they had six children:

With Janet:
William Stewart of Jedsworth, killed at the Battle of Homildon Hill. Ancestor of the Earls of Galloway

With Jonetta
John Stewart of Darnley, Lord of Aubigny and Concressault, Count of Évreux (k. 12 February 1429) killed at the Battle of the Herrings
Alexander Stewart of Torbane and Galston
Robert Stewart of Newtoun and Westoun
James Stewart
William Stewart of Castlemilk, (k.12 February 1429) killed at the Battle of the Herrings
Janet Stewart, married Thomas Somerville, 1st Lord Somerville

References

Books
Balfour Paul, Sir James, Scots Peerage, IX vols. Edinburgh 1904.

Year of birth unknown
1404 deaths
Alexander
14th-century Scottish people
15th-century Scottish people